Entomologica Americana may refer to two different journals:

 Entomologica Americana (Brooklyn Entomological Society)
 Entomologica Americana (New York Entomological Society)